The Metro B Line is a planned bus rapid transit route in Minneapolis and St. Paul. The route will operate mostly on Lake Street in Minneapolis before crossing the Mississippi River into St. Paul and operating mostly on Selby Avenue and ending in downtown St. Paul. The route was identified in Metro Transit's 2014 Arterial Transitway Corridors Study as one of eleven local routes to be upgraded to bus rapid transit. The route will have "train-like" features to speed up service, such as signal priority, all-door boarding, further stop spacing, and specialized vehicles. Planning and design is currently underway until 2021, with construction slated for 2022. The line would join the A Line and C Line as portions of Metro Transit's Metro system. Full funding for the line was secured in October 2020 with a final $35 million from the state of Minnesota.

Background
The corridor has a long history of transit service. The Twin City Rapid Transit Company operated a streetcar on Selby Avenue and Lake Street starting in 1906. Once the streetcars were replaced in the 1950s with buses, a bus route continued to operate over the route. Route 21 serves the corridor from Uptown Transit Center to the Union Depot in downtown Saint Paul. A limited stop bus, Route 53, operates during peak periods offering limited stop service along Lake Street and Marshall Avenue before traveling on I-94 to downtown Saint Paul. Average speeds for Route 21 and 53 are 10 and 13.2 miles per hour respectively, which makes Route 21 one of the slowest routes in the Twin Cities.

Buses on the corridor used to travel on the National Register of Historic Places-listed Selby Avenue Bridge over Ayd Mill Road. When the bridge was replaced in 1993, buses were detoured a half mile north to University Avenue. Increased ridership led Metro Transit to leave the detour in place following completion of the replacement bridge. 10,000 rides are taken on Route 21 on weekdays which makes it the second highest ridership route for Metro Transit. 

In May 2019 the project was estimated to cost $54 million. By October 2019 $16 million in funding had been identified from a competitive federal grant for a total of $26 million. The line was fully funded after $35 million was included in the state bonding bill in October 2020.

Route 

In 2011-2012 Metro Transit studied eleven urban transit corridors to be upgraded with enhanced bus improvements. Of the eleven, Route 21 was identified between West Lake Station and Snelling Avenue Station running on Lake Street in Minneapolis and Marshal Avenue in St. Paul with stations spaced a quarter mile to a half mile apart. This concept plan connected Southwest LRT, METRO E Line, Orange Line, D Line, Blue Line, A Line, and Green Lines.

Stations 
Stations as part of Metro Transit's aBRT (arterial bus rapid transit) service are unique to differentiate them service from local bus stops. Each station has a pylon marker that provides station identification, real time information, and audible departures. Unique shelters will have lighting, heating, emergency telephones and security cameras, and station areas will have seating, bike parking, and trash and recycling. To speed up boarding, platforms are raised  from the pavement to facilitate near-level boarding though any door. Passengers pay before hand using Go-To card readers or ticket vending machines.

At this time, only seven station pairs have been planned. West Lake Station will be constructed as part of the Southwest LRT project. The B Line will stop at or around Hennepin Avenue and Uptown Transit Station. A station at I-35W is being constructed as part of the Orange Line and 35W@94:Downtown to Crosstown projects. In 2020, Hennepin County will reconstruct Lake Street between Blaisedale Avenue and 5th Avenue adding stations at Nicollet Avenue and 4th Avenue. The B Line will also stop at or around Chicago Avenue and the Chicago-Lake Transit Center. The eastbound station at Midtown Station was constructed in 2017 as part of the South Minneapolis Regional Service Center, with the westbound station to be part of the Hi-Lake Interchange construction. On Snelling Avenue, stations would be shared at existing A Line stations. Specific station locations will be identified in 2020-2021 during the engineering phase.

Selby Avenue extension 
In early 2019 project staff identified the possibility of extending the line past Snelling Avenue into downtown St. Paul via Selby Avenue. Six routing options between Snelling Avenue and Lexington Parkway are under consideration. Of the six options, all would connect to the METRO A Line, while only two would connect to the METRO Green Line. In downtown, the B Line would share enhanced stations with the Metro Gold Line before terminating at Union Depot.

On October 28, 2019, it was publicly announced to the Transportation Committee of the Metropolitan Council that the route would extend past Snelling Avenue into downtown St. Paul. The recommended alignment does not have the route jog north of I-94 to connect to the METRO Green Line and Midway district of St. Paul. The rationale behind the decision was that more trips destined for the Lake Street-Marshall segment originated on Selby Avenue and downtown St. Paul than in Midway. The rationale also avoids congestion and delays that happen north of I-94, enabling more reliable travel times. Additionally, the B Line would have a direct north-south connection with the METRO A Line at Snelling & Dayton, which would fill the gap to the Midway district and METRO Green Line.

See also 
Metro A Line
Metro C Line
Metro D Line

References

External links 

B Line Project website

Bus rapid transit in Minnesota
Proposed bus rapid transit in the United States
Proposed public transportation in Minnesota
Transportation in Minneapolis
Transportation in Saint Paul, Minnesota
Metro Transit (Minnesota)